Sojourn Shelton II (born December 25, 1994) is an American football cornerback who is a free agent. He played college football at Wisconsin, and was signed by the Arizona Cardinals as an undrafted free agent in 2017.

Early years
Shelton attended Plantation High School in Plantation, Florida. He was a defensive back for their football team. As a senior, he was rated as a four-star recruit and the 27th best cornerback in the nation. After receiving offers from several big colleges such as Florida State, Ole Miss, and West Virginia, Shelton committed to the University of Wisconsin–Madison to play college football.

College career
In his first year with the Badgers in 2013, Shelton played all 13 games in the season which included 12 starts at cornerback, in which he recorded thirty-six tackles, four interceptions (tying for third in the Big Ten), and seven pass breakups. He became the first true freshmen to start in a season opener since Travis Frederick in 2009. In 2014, he had a season that only included 33 tackles and 6 pass breakups.

In 2015, Shelton seemed to have an increasingly mediocre season, statistically. He recorded 27 tackles, one interception, and seven pass breakups. His sole interception came in the fourth quarter of the 2015 Holiday Bowl helping seal a 23-21 victory over The University of Southern California Trojans. In his final season with Wisconsin in 2016, he had a career high season in interceptions and pass breakups with 4 interceptions and 12 pass-breakups. On November 26, 2016, he logged a 2 interception game against Minnesota.

Professional career
After what most analysts called an "above average" career at Wisconsin, he was projected to go undrafted by NFL.com. He was invited to the 2016 NFL Combine, where he performed in every workout besides the splits. He achieved a 4.02 second 20-yard shuttle, which ranked third best in his position. He attended the Wisconsin Badgers Pro day, where he chose to only do the 40 yard dash, broad jump, and three cone drill.

Arizona Cardinals
Shelton was signed by the Arizona Cardinals as an undrafted free agent on May 2, 2017. He was waived on September 2, 2017.

Cincinnati Bengals
On September 4, 2017, Shelton was signed to the Cincinnati Bengals' practice squad. He was released on October 27, 2017. On November 14, 2017, Shelton was signed back to the Bengals practice squad. He signed a reserve/future contract with the Bengals on January 1, 2018.

On August 23, 2018, Shelton was waived by the Bengals.

Philadelphia Eagles
On August 11, 2019, Shelton was signed by the Philadelphia Eagles. He was waived during final roster cuts on August 30, 2019.

Arizona Cardinals (second stint)
On November 13, 2019, Shelton was signed to the Arizona Cardinals practice squad. He signed a reserve/future contract with the Cardinals on December 30, 2019.

On June 1, 2020, Shelton was released by the Cardinals.

Chicago Bears
On December 30, 2020, Shelton signed with the practice squad of the Chicago Bears. His practice squad contract with the team expired after the season on January 18, 2021.

References

External links

 Sojourn Shelton on Twitter
 Sojourn Shelton on Instagram
 Wisconsin Badgers bio

1994 births
Living people
Shelton, Sojourn
Players of American football from Fort Lauderdale, Florida
American football cornerbacks
Wisconsin Badgers football players
Arizona Cardinals players
Cincinnati Bengals players
Philadelphia Eagles players
Chicago Bears players